Axiocrita is a monotypic snout moth genus. It was described by Alfred Jefferis Turner in 1913 and contains the species Axiocrita cataphanes. It is found in Australia.

References

Epipaschiinae
Monotypic moth genera
Moths of Australia
Pyralidae genera